Hypothecla is a genus of butterflies in the family Lycaenidae. The genus was erected by Georg Semper in 1890.

Species
Hypothecla astyla (C. Felder & R. Felder, 1862) Philippines
Hypothecla honos de Nicéville, 1898 Sulawesi

References

 1973: The higher classification of the Lycaenidae (Lepidoptera): a tentative arrangement. Bulletin of the British Museum (Natural History) (Entomology), 28: 371-505.
, 1862. Lepidoptera nova a Dre. Carolo Semper in insulis Philippinis collecta, Series secunda. Wiener Entomologische Monatschrift 6 (9): 282-294.
, 1886–1892. Die Schmetterlinge der Philippinischen Inseln, I. Tagfalter. 380 + 14 pp., 49 + 2 pls. Wiesbaden.

, 2003. The Butterflies of Sulawesi, NMNH, Leiden.

External links

 With images.

Theclinae
Lycaenidae genera
Taxa named by Georg Semper